Billboard is a large outdoor sign usually used for advertising.

Billboard may also refer to:

Arts and entertainment
 Billboard (magazine), a music and entertainment media brand
 Billboard charts, inspired by the magazine
 Billboard Music Award, sponsored by the magazine
 Billboard Türkiye, official Turkish chart magazine founded in 2006
 Billboard, a large film poster called a "Twenty four sheet"
 "Billboard", an episode of the sitcom Malcolm in the Middle 
 Billboard, television ident for BBC Two used in 1992, from the 1991-2001 series of idents
 Three Billboards Outside Ebbing, Missouri, 2017 crime drama film

Other uses
 The Billboard, a massive granite monolith in West Antarctica
 Billboard, a 3D computer graphics sprite that is always facing the viewer

See also
 Billboard antenna, an array of parallel antennas with flat reflectors